Kiwuri (Aymara  canine tooth or tusk, -ri a suffix, also spelled Quiburi) is a mountain in the Andes of Bolivia which reaches a height of approximately . It is located in the Oruro Department, Eduardo Abaroa Province, Challapata Municipality. The Waylla Q'awa which originates northeast of the mountain flows along its northern slope.

References 

Mountains of Oruro Department